Verla Clemens Insko (born February 5, 1936) is a  Democratic member of the North Carolina House of Representatives. Insko has represented the 56th district (including constituents in Orange County) since 1997. She is a retired health program administrator from Chapel Hill, North Carolina. Insko also previously served as a member of the Chapel Hill-Carrboro Board of Education from 1977 to 1985 and on the Orange County Board of Commissioners from 1990 to 1994. She has been noted for her progressive policy positions, such as her support for publicly funded universal health care, and stated in a candidate questionnaire, "I believe in an activist government that provides for the common good and protects the vulnerable". On September 15, 2021 Insko announced that she wouldn't seek re-election to the NC House in 2022.

Committee assignments

2021-2022 session
Appropriations
Appropriations - Health and Human Services
Health (Vice Chair)
Education - Universities
Election Law and Campaign Finance Reform
Environment
Ethics

2019-2020 session
Appropriations
Appropriations - Health and Human Services
Health
Education - Universities
Environment
Ethics
Homelessness, Foster Care, and Dependency

2017-2018 session
Appropriations
Appropriations - Health and Human Services
Health
Education - Universities
Homelessness, Foster Care, and Dependency
Insurance

2015-2016 session
Appropriations
Appropriations - Health and Human Services (Vice Chair)
Health
Education - Community Colleges
Environment
Insurance
Judiciary III
State Personnel

2013-2014 session
Appropriations
Environment
Health and Human Services
Insurance
Judiciary

2011-2012 session
Appropriations
Environment
Health and Human Services
Insurance
Judiciary

2009-2010 session
Appropriations
Health
Education
Environment and Natural Resources
Judiciary I
Mental Health Reform
Rules, Calendar, and Operations of the House

Electoral history

2020

2018

2016

2014

2012

2010

2008

2006

2004

2002

2000

1998

References

External links
 Indy Week Article
 Official Candidate Website

|-

1936 births
Living people
People from Benton County, Arkansas
People from Chapel Hill, North Carolina
University of North Carolina at Chapel Hill alumni
American health activists
20th-century American politicians
21st-century American politicians
20th-century American women politicians
21st-century American women politicians
Women state legislators in North Carolina
County commissioners in North Carolina
Democratic Party members of the North Carolina House of Representatives